Wilkes County is a county located in the east central portion of the U.S. state of Georgia. As of the 2020 census, the population was 9,565. The county seat is the city of Washington.

Referred to as "Washington-Wilkes", the county seat and county are commonly treated as a single entity by locals, including the area's historical society and the Chamber of Commerce. It is part of the Central Savannah River Area (CSRA).

History
Wilkes County, named for British politician and supporter of American independence, John Wilkes, is considered Georgia's first county established by European Americans; it was the first of eight original counties created in the first state constitution on February 5, 1777. The other seven counties were organized from existing colonial parishes.

Wilkes was unique in being made up of land ceded in 1773 by the indigenous Creek and Cherokee Native American nations in their respective Treaties of Augusta. Its location was unique due to its close proximity to the Atlantic seaboard fall line.

Between 1790 and 1854, Wilkes County's area was reduced as it was divided to organize new counties following the growth of population in the area. The Georgia legislature formed the counties of Elbert, Oglethorpe, and Lincoln entirely from portions of Wilkes County. Wilkes also contributed part of the lands used in the creation of Madison, Warren, Taliaferro, Hart, McDuffie, and Greene Counties.

Wilkes County was the site of one of the most important battles of the American Revolutionary War to be fought in Georgia. During the Battle of Kettle Creek in 1779, the American Patriot forces were victorious over British Loyalists.

During the eighteenth and nineteenth centuries, colonists depended on enslaved African-American workers and whites to clear land, develop plantations, and cultivate and process cotton in this area. Long-staple cotton would not grow in this upland areas and short-staple cotton was originally too labor-intensive to be profitable.

In 1793, American Eli Whitney perfected his revolutionary invention of the cotton gin at Mount Pleasant, a cotton plantation east of Washington. It allowed mechanization of the processing of short-staple cotton, making its cultivation profitable in the upland areas. As a result, there was a dramatic increase in the development of new cotton plantations throughout the Deep South to cultivate short-staple cotton. 

Settlers increased pressure on the federal government to remove Native Americans from the region, including the Five Civilized Tribes from the Southeast. In 1794, Revolutionary War veteran Elijah Clarke, led a group of men from Wilkes County into traditionally Creek lands and established a town and several forts and called it the Trans-Oconee Republic. While short lived, the incursion was part of a broader movement of incursion into traditionally native lands. Congress passed the Indian Removal Act in 1830 and the government forcibly removed most of the members of these tribes to Indian Territory west of the Mississippi River.

Production of short-staple cotton in the Deep South soon superseded that of long-staple cotton, grown primarily on the Sea Islands and in the Low Country. Such expansion dramatically increased the demand for slave labor in the Deep South, resulting in a longstanding domestic slave trade that transported more than a million slaves in forced migrations from the Upper South. King Cotton brought great wealth to many planters in the decades before the Civil War.

None of the battles of the American Civil War was fought in or near Wilkes County. But here President Jefferson Davis met for the final time with the Confederate Cabinet, and they officially dissolved the government of the Confederate States of America.  Wilkes County was the last-known location of the gold rumored to have been lost from the Confederate Treasury. The present-day Wilkes County Courthouse was built in Washington at the site of the cabinet meeting.

Geography
It is located in the Piedmont region above the fall line.

The northern quarter of Wilkes County, in a curved line from Rayle through Tignall to the northeastern corner of the county, is located in the Broad River sub-basin of the Savannah River basin. The eastern portion of the county, from Washington east, and bordered to the north and west by the Broad River sub-basin, is located in the Upper Savannah River sub-basin of the larger Savannah River basin. The rest of the county, south of Washington, is located in the Little River sub-basin of the Savannah River basin.

Major highways

  U.S. Route 78
  U.S. Route 78 Business
  U.S. Route 378
  State Route 10
  State Route 10 Business
  State Route 17
  State Route 44
  State Route 47
  State Route 80

Adjacent counties
 Elbert County (north)
 Lincoln County (east)
 McDuffie County (southeast)
 Warren County (south)
 Taliaferro County (southwest)
 Oglethorpe County (west)

Demographics
Changes in agriculture through mechanization, the Great Depression, and a mass migration of African Americans from the area in the mid-20th century have resulted in a decline of population in the rural county since 1930.

2000 census
As of the census of 2000, there were 10,687 people, 4,314 households, and 2,968 families living in the county.  The population density was 23 people per square mile (9/km2).  There were 5,022 housing units at an average density of 11 per square mile (4/km2).  The racial makeup of the county was 55.12% White, 43.05% Black or African American, 0.20% Native American, 0.23% Asian, 0.04% Pacific Islander, 0.51% from other races, and 0.85% from two or more races.  1.98% of the population were Hispanic or Latino of any race.

There were 4,314 households, out of which 29.10% had children under the age of 18 living with them, 47.10% were married couples living together, 17.30% had a female householder with no husband present, and 31.20% were non-families. 28.10% of all households were made up of individuals, and 13.80% had someone living alone who was 65 years of age or older.  The average household size was 2.45 and the average family size was 2.98.

In the county, the population was spread out, with 24.00% under the age of 18, 8.00% from 18 to 24, 26.70% from 25 to 44, 24.10% from 45 to 64, and 17.10% who were 65 years of age or older.  The median age was 39 years. For every 100 females there were 91.50 males.  For every 100 females age 18 and over, there were 88.00 males.

The median income for a household in the county was $27,644, and the median income for a family was $36,219. Males had a median income of $27,355 versus $21,298 for females. The per capita income for the county was $15,020.  About 13.00% of families and 17.50% of the population were below the poverty line, including 24.20% of those under age 18 and 19.90% of those age 65 or over.

2010 census
As of the 2010 United States Census, there were 10,593 people, 4,263 households, and 2,841 families living in the county. The racial makeup of the county was 53.0% white, 42.8% black or African American, 0.5% Asian, 0.2% American Indian, 2.0% from other races, and 1.5% from two or more races. Those of Hispanic or Latino origin made up 3.4% of the population. In terms of ancestry, 10.3% were American, and 9.1% were English.

Of the 4,263 households, 30.0% had children under the age of 18 living with them, 42.7% were married couples living together, 18.8% had a female householder with no husband present, 33.4% were non-families, and 29.6% of all households were made up of individuals. The average household size was 2.40 and the average family size was 2.96. The median age was 43.4 years.

The median income for a household in the county was $28,022 and the median income for a family was $39,109. Males had a median income of $36,993 versus $24,874 for females. The per capita income for the county was $16,993. About 21.2% of families and 25.5% of the population were below the poverty line, including 37.7% of those under age 18 and 17.2% of those age 65 or over.

2020 census

As of the 2020 United States Census, there were 9,565 people, 3,979 households, and 2,421 families residing in the county.

Communities
 Rayle
 Tignall
 Washington (county seat)

Notable people
 Edward Porter Alexander
 Eliza Frances Andrews
 Benjamin F. Bryant, captain in the Battle of San Jacinto, founder of the Bryant Station frontier fort and Texas Ranger
 John Clark, Georgia governor
 Elijah Clarke
 Peter Early
 Frank Edwards, blues musician
 Stephen Heard
 Hosea Hudson (1898-1988) Black communist labor organizer and author of Black Worker in the Deep South
 George Mathews, Continental Army officer, Governor of Georgia, and US Congressman; member of the Mathews family
 Jesse Mercer
 David Meriwether, Continental Army officer, member United States Congress, Speaker of the Georgia House of Representatives, Major General - Georgia Militia
 Paul Jones Semmes
 Alexander H. Stephens
 Matthew Talbot
 Benjamin Taliaferro
 Robert Toombs
 George W. Towns

Politics

See also

 Wilkes County Courthouse
 National Register of Historic Places listings in Wilkes County, Georgia
 Central Savannah River Area
List of counties in Georgia

References

External links

 Wilkes County, Georgia genealogy and history
 Georgia Historical Markers in Wilkes County
 History of Wilkes County
 Washington-Wilkes Chamber of Commerce

 
Georgia (U.S. state) counties
1777 establishments in Georgia (U.S. state)
Populated places established in 1777